Aqcheh Kand (also Romanized as Āqcheh Kand; also known as Āghcheh Kand and Āqcheh Kandī) is a village in Kalkharan Rural District, in the Central District of Ardabil County, Ardabil Province, Iran. At the 2006 census, its population was 567, in 126 families.

References 

Towns and villages in Ardabil County